The Central Committee of the 2nd Congress of the Russian Social Democratic Labour Party was in session from 1903 to 1905.

Plenums
The Central Committee was not a permanent institution. It convened plenary sessions and meetings. Four meetings were held between the 1st Congress and the 3rd Congress.

Composition

References

Citations

Bibliography
 

Central Committee elected by the 04
1903 establishments in the Russian Empire
1905 disestablishments in the Russian Empire